Disney Fairies is a Disney franchise created in 2005. The franchise is built around the character of Tinker Bell from Disney's 1953 animated film Peter Pan, subsequently adopted as a mascot for the company. In addition to the fictional fairy character created by J. M. Barrie, the franchise introduces many new characters and expands substantially upon the limited information the author gave about the fairies and their home of Never Land. The characters are referred to within stories as "Never Land fairies." The franchise includes children's books and other merchandise, a website and the computer-animated Tinker Bell film series, featuring the character and several of the Disney fairies as supporting and recurring characters.

Setting
In Barrie's 1902 novel The Little White Bird, in which he introduced the mythos of Peter Pan and the fairies, he wrote: "When the first baby laughed for the first time, his laugh broke into a million pieces, and they all went skipping about. That was the beginning of fairies." The Disney Fairies are based on a similar idea: every time a newborn baby laughs for the first time, that laugh travels out into the world and those that make their way to Never Land turn into a Never fairy.

The fairies generally reside in the Home Tree, a towering, massive tree located in the very heart of Pixie Hollow in Never Land. Various groups of fairies work and live nearby as well. Most of the fairy characters are young and female, but older, taller and male fairy characters are also included. The males are sometimes referred to as "sparrow men," though the term "fairies" is used to refer to both female and male fairy characters.

Recurring characters

Characters in the films

Blaze (Eliza Pollack Zebert) is a baby firefly who joins Tinker Bell on her quest to find the mystical Mirror of Incanta that grants one wish.
Bobble (Rob Paulsen) is a tinker-talent sparrow man and Clank's best friend. He is short and very slender with red hair, bright blue eyes, fair skin and wears water drop goggles. He wears a leafy sleeveless top and knee-length pants. His real names are Phineas T. Kettletree and Esquire and he has a Scottish accent.
Bolt (Roger Craig Smith) is one of the dust-talent sparrow men.
Buck (Rob Paulsen) is an animal sparrow man. He is Fawn's partner. He is short with brown hair, green eyes, and fair skin and wears an orange sports shirt.
Cheese (Bob Bergen) is a cart-pulling mouse.
Chloe (Brenda Song) is a garden fairy of Thai descent. She is Rosetta's partner. She is short with short brown hair, brown eyes, and fair skin. She wears a pink sports dress and leggings.
Clank (Jeff Bennett) is a tinker-talent sparrow man. He has black hair and dark brown eyes and fair skin. He wears a leafy sleeveless top and shorts. Clank speaks with a Cockney accent.
Dewey (Jeff Bennett) is the Keeper of all fairy knowledge and a Winter fairy. He is short and portly with white hair and a white mustache and aqua eyes. He wears a green coat and spectacles and carries a staff. He speaks with a Western accent.
Dr. Martin Griffiths (Michael Sheen) is a British insect scientist with a daughter named Lizzy. He is slender with fair skin, brown hair, and eyes. He wears a green vest, a white shirt, and a black bowtie. He appears in Great Fairy Rescue.
Elizabeth “Lizzy” Griffiths (Lauren Mote) is a pretty 9-year-old British girl and the daughter of Dr. Martin Griffiths. She is slender with green eyes, fair skin, and brown hair with braided pigtails and wears a pink long-sleeved dress and a white smock with small tulips all over.
Fairy Gary (Jeff Bennett) is a Scottish-accented overseer of the pixie dust fairies. He has a big brown mustache, hair and eyebrows, and a large nose. He wears a kilt.
Fairy Mary (Jane Horrocks) is an overseer of the tinker fairies. She has an English accent. She is a bit larger with brown hair and eyes and fairer skin. She wears a green sleeveless dress and leggings.
Fawn (America Ferrera, Angela Bartys and Ginnifer Goodwin) is an animal fairy. She is the protagonist of Tinker Bell and the Legend of the NeverBeast. Fawn is slender with tanned skin, freckles, braided light brown hair, pointy ears, and amber eyes. She wears an orange medium dress and ocher boots.
Fern (Zendaya) is a garden fairy of German descent. She is small with fair skin, green eyes, and brown hair. Fern wears a pink dress and shoes.
Fiona is Dewey's pet snowy lynx.
Flint (Thom Adcox-Hernandez) is one of the dust-talent sparrow men.
Glimmer (Tiffany Thornton) is a storm fairy of German descent. She is Rumble's partner. She is slender with blonde hair, green eyes, fair skin, and pink blushing cheeks. She wears a black/gray sports shirt.
Grimsley (Rob Paulsen) is a troll who guards a bridge on a lost island north of Neverland.
Gliss (Grey DeLisle) is a frost fairy and a best friend of Periwinkle. She is slender with white hair, blue eyes, and fair skin and wears a blue shirt, pants and shoes.
Hawks – The hawks are the most dangerous animals of Neverland, killing the fairies every year.
Iridessa (Raven-Symoné) is a light-talent fairy. She is slender and hand-sized with: medium-light brown skin, black pixie dust hair in a round-up-do, brown eyes, pointy ears, and clear fairy wings on her back and wears a yellow mustard medium dress and matching yellow shoes with sunflower petals with a sunflower on his hair.
Ivy (Kari Wahlgren) is one of Rosetta's garden fairy friends of Dutch descent. She is short with blonde hair, blue eyes, and fair skin and wears a red dress and shoes.
Leech (Jeff Bennett) is a troll who guards a bridge on a lost island north of Neverland.
Lilac (Jessica DiCicco) is one of Rosetta's garden fairy friends. She is short with blonde hair, blue eyes, and fair skin. She wears a red strapless dress and shoes.
Lord Milori (Timothy Dalton) is a frost fairy and the leader of the Winter fairies and is the love interest of Queen Clarion. He is slender with white hair and grey eyes. He wears a teal blue suit and a white cape made of feathers. His right-wing is broken.
Lumina (Jessica DiCicco) is a light fairy of Irish descent. She is Iridessa's partner. She is slender with brown hair, green eyes, fair skin, and pink blushing cheeks. She wears a yellow sports shirt.
Lyria (Grey DeLisle) is a Scottish storyteller fairy. She is slender with a long brunette braid and: a loose curl, green eyes, fair skin, and pink blushing cheeks. She wears a white single-strapped dress that has a purple tip.
Marina is a new water fairy. She is Silvermist's partner. She is slender with brown hair and skin and green eyes and wears a blue sports shirt.
Minister of Autumn (Richard Portnow and John DiMaggio), aka Redleaf, is the minister of Autumn of Brazilian descent. He is slender with brown hair, brown eyes, and fair skin and wears clothing made out of gold leaves. 
Minister of Spring (Steve Valentine), aka Hyacinth, is the minister of Spring. He is tall and slender with brown hair, green eyes, and fair skin and wears a leaf crown and clothing made out of violets and blues. He is Russian. 
Minister of Summer (Kathy Najimy), aka Sunflower, is the minister of Summer. She is quite large with brown hair, green eyes, and fair skin and wears clothing made out of lilies. She has an Australian accent.
Minister of Winter (Gail Borges), aka Snowflake, is the minister of Winter. She is slender with white hair, blue eyes, and fair skin and wears an ice crown and clothing made out of snowflakes. She is Russian.
Mr. Owl (Rob Paulsen) is an owl whom some Never fairies go to for advice.
Mr. Twitches is a male calico cat belonging to the Griffiths family.
Mrs. Perkins' (Faith Prince) is a human neighbor of Lizzy and her father.
Nyx (Rosario Dawson) is an incredibly loyal and devoted scouting-talent antihero in Legend of the NeverBeast. She protects all of Pixie Hollow from any dangers or threats and also leads a team of fellow scout fairies who follow her commands without question. She is known to be quite tough and the kind of fairy who will never back down or give up. She does as much as possible to ensure the safety and well-being of Pixie Hollow and its people.
Periwinkle (Lucy Hale) is a frost fairy. She is Tinker Bell's fraternal twin sister; born of the same baby's first laugh. She has a little frame, pale skin, snow-white hair, and ice-blue eyes. She wears a teal medium dress and matching silver shoes with pompom additions, like Tinker bell. Periwinkle's wings are identical to her sister's and occasionally glow when they're close together.
Queen Clarion (Anjelica Huston) is the queen of Pixie Hollow. She is slender and taller than most of the other fairies. She has pale skin, sapphire blue eyes, and honey brown hair in an up-do, and unique, large, and golden butterfly wings. Queen Clarion wears a beautiful shimmering gold dress made of pixie dust and different tiaras for certain occasions.
Rosetta (Kristin Chenoweth and Megan Hilty) is a garden-talent fairy. She is the protagonist of Pixie Hollow Games. Rosetta is slim and has shoulder-length red hair with curled ends, bright green eyes, and clear fairy wings. She wears a red-pink medium dress and maching red ankle strap shoes with a rose on his hair.
Rumble (Jason Dolley) is a storm sparrow man of Austrian descent. He appears in Pixie Hollow Games. He is small and muscular with black hair, blue eyes, and fair skin. He wears a black/grey sports shirt.
Scribble (Thomas Lennon) is the librarian of Pixie Hollow. He is slender with black hair and brown eyes and wears wood-framed glasses. He speaks with a pre-pubescent crack to his voice. He is very taken with Nyx. He wears a dark turquoise lily single-strapped dress with blue shoes.
Silvermist (Lucy Liu) is a water-talent fairy. She is slender with pale skin, long loose dark blue hair, brown eyes, and clear fairy wings and wears a medium blue dress and matching turquoise ankle strap shoes.
Sled (Matt Lanter) is a winter animal talent sparrow man. He is short but well-toned and hand-sized with: black hair, blue eyes, fair skin, and pointy ears and wears an aqua shirt. He is Rosetta's romantic interest and one of Periwinkle's friends. In the movie The Pirate Fairy, he stops being Rosetta's romantic interest.
Slush (Benjamin Diskin) is a frost sparrow man and one of Periwinkle's friends. He is of Croatian descent. Slush is small and slender with blonde hair, blue eyes, and fair skin. He wears a blue cap, an aqua shirt, and pants.
Stone (Roger Craig Smith) is one of the dust-talent sparrow men.
Spike (Debby Ryan) is a frost fairy and another of Periwinkle's close friends. She is of Ukrainian descent. She is slender with black hair, brown eyes, and pale skin. She wears a blue dress and blue boots.
Terence (Jesse McCartney) is a pixie dust sparrow man of French-Celtic descent. He has a big crush on Tinker Bell and is also her best friend. He is short, slender, and hand-sized with: blonde hair, blue eyes, fair skin, and pointy ears and wears an acorn top hat.
Tinker Bell (Mae Whitman) is a tinker-talent fairy and the main protagonist of the first 4 movies. She is a slim fairy with fair skin, blue eyes, and shoulder-length blonde hair with a fringe, which is worn in a bun. She wears a medium dark green dress with lime in the down part, and matching emerald shoes with pompoms. She has clear fairy wings which are identical to her sister, Periwinkle.
Vidia (Pamela Adlon) is a proud fast-flying-talent fairy. She has dark violet ponytailed hair, grey eyes, pointy ears, and clear wings on her back. She was Tinker Bell's enemy at first in the first movie, but later became one of her closest friends in the third movie, although the two still constantly bicker.
Viola (Grey DeLisle) is a summoning fairy of Irish descent. She is slender with blonde hair, brown eyes, and fair skin. She wears formal herald's clothing and a black cap with a white feather on top.
Zarina (Christina Hendricks) is a misguided dust-keeper fairy, who steals the mystical blue pixie dust from the mighty Pixie Dust Tree, endangering all of Pixie Hollow. She joins forces with the pirates of Skull Rock in The Pirate Fairy.
Zephyr (Alicyn Packard) is a fast-flying fairy of Greek descent. She is Vidia's partner. She is slender and hand-sized with brown hair, green eyes, and fair skin and wears a purple sports shirt.

Characters in the books

Major non-fairy characters 
Several key characters are not Never Fairies.

 Brother Dove: A dove who carries the wingless water fairy Rani on his back when she wishes to fly. He may be one of Mother Dove's chicks since he can talk to all the fairies, not just animal talents.
 Fufalla: A wand fairy who loves to play pranks and practical jokes on others.
 Kyto: A dragon who has been caged for as long as anyone can remember. He is very sneaky and once, when Mother Dove's egg broke, he had to make it whole again with a trade of: Captain Hook's double cigar holder, the golden hawk's feather, a mermaid's comb and Rani's wings.
 Mother Dove: A dove who has an egg that is in Pixie Hollow that was broken but restored by Rani, Vidia and Prilla in Fairy Dust and the Quest for the Egg. Mother Dove helps the people in Neverland stay young and is mentioned in every book.
 Tutupia: The queen of the Great Wanded fairies (or Great Wandies). Great-wand fairies are about seven feet tall and have mystical wands or scepters that possess many magical properties.

Fairies 
Fawn, Iridessa, Queen Clarion, Rosetta, Silvermist, Sweetpea, Terence, Tinker Bell, Vidia and many others are the only fairies from the books to appear in the films. Sweetpea only appears in The Pirate Fairy, as well as a small cameo in Tinker Bell and the Legend of the NeverBeast.

Some of Tink's book-only best friends also may appear in a crossover special with the Fairies in the movies and with other shows:

Beck: An animal-talent fairy
Bess: An art-talent fairy
Fira: A light-talent fairy
Lily: A garden/earth-talent fairy
Prilla: A travel-talent fairy, introduced in Fairy Dust and the Quest for the Egg. The only fairy of her talent, Prilla can travel between Neverland and the human world. This allows her to encourage children to clap and save fairies' lives. All the other talents treat her as an honorary member and she is sometimes considered odd for her tendency to use human phrases over fairy.
Rani: A water fairy. Rani plays a major role in Fairy Dust and the Quest for the Egg, along with Prilla and Vidia. To save Mother Dove, the other fairies and Neverland, the fairies must retrieve a mermaid's comb. However, fairies cannot swim because their wings absorb water and drag them down. To obtain the comb, Rani cuts off her wings, becoming the only fairy who cannot fly, but also the only fairy that can swim.
 Cinda, Grace, Liesel and Rhia—the Queen's helper-talents who make sure everything is in tip-top shape for her—appear a few times in the Chapter books.

Others include:
 Angus: An expert pot-and-pans sparrow man
 Duncan: A baking talent fairy and sparrow man. He has more patience than Mixie.
 Elwood: A fast-flying talented fairy and sparrow man who loves purple and talks as fast as he flies. He can be annoying, but he is very kindhearted.
 Ginger: A baking-talent fairy who likes to show up to Dulcie with her baking and tends to be very rude. She took over when Dulcie had a vacation. But, they soon learn to work together.
 Glissandra: A cheerful, blonde, light-talent fairy who wears makeup a lot.
 Humidia: A water talent who makes the jet at the top of the water fountain in Rani in the Mermaid Lagoon.
 Hydrangea: A beautiful water talent fairy who always wears blue eyeshadow.
 Idalia: A garden talent fairy with dark brown hair.
 Luminaria: A cheerful, blonde, light-talent fairy.
 Luna: A beautiful, light fairy like the glue that keeps Fira and Iridessa together.
 Magnolia: A leaf talent fairy.
 Melina: A glass-blowing, art-talent fairy. She has strawberry blonde hair, blue eyes and peach skin. Her main outfit is: a blue shirt, teal pants, an emerald green leaf headscarf, a green apron and olive green shoes.
 Mixie: A baking talent fairy who helps Dulcie.
 Nettle: A fairy whose magical talent is caterpillar-shearing. She, Prilla and Myka are friends.
 Nilsa: A scout fairy who dies of disbelief in Fairy Dust and the Quest for the Egg.
 Nollie: A brunette, cute, grateful animal-talent fairy.
 Olwen: A young garden fairy who loves planting seeds and looks up to Tinker Bell and Queen Clarion.
 Pell: A harvest-talent fairy and Pluck's best friend (they look like twins).
 Pluck: A harvest-talent fairy who loves to find and collect delicious fruits and nuts.
 Quill: An art-talent fairy who is quiet, shy and is very good friends with Bess.
 Rune: A story-telling fairy.
 Scarlet: A new art-talent fairy. She is especially skilled in pottery and is friends with Bess.
 Sera: A scouting-talent fairy.
 Spring: A spunky message-talent fairy who is good friends with Fira and Lily.
 Sweet Pea: A new fairy (mentioned above).
 Temma: A shoemaker fairy who dies drowning in a flood in Fairy Haven and the Quest for the Wand.
 Tizzywing: A fast-flying fairy who gets sick easily and, unlike Vidia, is very kind.
 Trak: A scouting-talent sparrow man. He is Myka's friend.
 Twire: A scrap-metal talent fairy who melts down metal to recycle. She sometimes fights with Tinker Bell over who gets to keep the metal for melting or fixing.
 Violet: One of the cutest fairies in Pixie Hollow. She is a dyeing talent who has corkscrew curls and is friends with Bess.
 Wisp: A new fast-flying-talent fairy who is almost as fast as Vidia, through training. She and Vidia race through the Hollow and later engage in a friendly rivalry.
 Zuzu: A tinker-talent fairy who is very loyal to her job.

Never Mermaids 
There is a set of key Never Mermaids:

 Numi: She has blue hair and a magenta tail.
 Oola: A mermaid with yellow-green hair, green eyes and a yellow-green tail. She's the first mermaid to befriend Rani but has a weird way of showing it.
 Pah: A beautiful mermaid of middle rank who talks funny and is Soop's best friend.
 Rory: A helping talent fairy with brown hair in a loose braid, wears a rose petal dress.
 Soop: A beautiful and generous mermaid of middle rank who can be impatient. She is the one who gave her comb to Rani to give to Kyto in exchange for restoring Mother Dove's egg.
 Voona: She has yellow-orange hair, a yellow-orange tail and a violet scarf.

Publications
Disney Publishing Worldwide transferred the Disney Fairies franchise's main publishing license to Little, Brown Books for Young Readers in January 2014 except for the Never Girls series starting in February. This rollout will include nine titles including: leveled readers, storybooks, a Passport to the Reading title, a sticker book and a board book. Brown planned to introduce a new character, Croc, in the board book to allow the line to appeal to younger readers, including some boys. Additionally, Brown's plan includes a greater connection to the Peter Pan story, pirates and Never Land. Five of the books tie into the home video release of The Pirate Fairy.

Fairy Dust trilogy

At the opening of the 2005 Bologna International Children's Book Fair, the Walt Disney Company revealed its plan to introduce a children's illustrated novel for girls 6–10 years of age. Disney Fairies debuted September 2005, when Disney Publishing Worldwide unveiled the novel Fairy Dust and the Quest for the Egg, written by Newbery Honor-winning author Gail Carson Levine with a $1 million marketing and publicity campaign and a virtual world. It was released in 45 countries and 32 languages and became a New York Times bestseller and has already sold over 1 million copies worldwide.

The story begins in Fairy Haven/Pixie Hollow, located in the heart of Never Land. Prilla, who is a brand-new fairy, born of a baby's laugh, arrives in Never Land and discovers that she has no talent for any of the fairy avocations. Tinker Bell takes Prilla to see Mother Dove, but before the wise bird can advise Prilla, Never Land is shaken by a terrible hurricane. Mother Dove is thrown off her nest and her precious egg, which holds all the secrets of Never Land, is shattered. Immediately, all those who live in Never Land begin to age. The island's only hope is for some brave fairies to take the egg pieces to Kyto the dragon and ask him to restore it with his fiery breath.

The book was followed in 2007 by a sequel, entitled Fairy Haven and the Quest for the Wand'. Another sequel, Fairies and the Quest for Never Land', was released in 2010.

In the Year of a Million Dreams celebration, book stores released a form submitting a fairy character. The winner is said to be put in his/her fairy book.

Tales of Pixie Hollow 
Random House has published a series of chapter books starting soon after the release of the first novel under the banner Tales of Pixie Hollow.

 The Trouble with Tink ~ by Kiki Thorpe
 Vidia and the Fairy Crown ~ by Laura Driscoll
 Beck and the Great Berry Battle ~ by Laura Driscoll
 Lily's Pesky Plant ~ by Kirsten Larsen
 Rani in the Mermaid Lagoon ~ by Lisa Papademetriou
 Fira and the Full Moon ~ by Gail Herman
 Tinker Bell Takes Charge ~ by Eleanor Fremont (included in Tinker Bell: Two Pirate Tales, published separately by HarperCollins)
 A Masterpiece for Bess ~ by Lara Bergen
 Prilla and the Butterfly Lie ~ by Kitty Richards
 Rani and the Three Treasures ~ by Kimberly Morris (included in Rani: Two Friendship Tales, published separately by HarperCollins)
 Tink, North of Never Land ~ by Kiki Thorpe
 Beck Beyond the Sea ~ by Kimberly Morris
 Dulcie's Taste of Magic ~ by Gail Herman
 Silvermist and the Ladybug Curse ~ by Gail Herman
 Fawn and the Mysterious Trickster ~ by Laura Driscoll
 Rosetta's Daring Day ~ by Lisa Papademetriou
 Iridessa, Lost at Sea ~ by Lisa Papademetriou
 Queen Clarion's Secret ~ by Kimberly Morris
 Myka Finds Her Way ~ by Gail Herman
 Lily in Full Bloom ~ by Laura Driscoll
 Vidia Meets Her Match ~ by Kiki Thorpe
 Four Clues for Rani ~ by Catherine Daly
 Trill Changes Her Tune ~ by Gail Herman
 Tink in a Fairy Fix ~ by Kiki Thorpe
 Rosetta's Dress Mess ~ by Laura Driscoll
 Art Lessons by Bess ~ by Amy Vincent (included in Bess: Two Colorful Tales)

Step Into Reading books
 The Great Fairy Race (Step 3)
 A Fairy Tale (Step 3)
 A Game of Hide-and-Seek (Step 3)
 Tink's Treasure Hunt (Step 3)
 Beck's Bunny Secret (Step 3)
 Vidia Takes Charge (Step 3)
 New Friends (Step 3)
 The Fairy Berry Bake-Off (Step 4)
 Pixie Hollow Paint Day (Step 4)
 A Dozen Fairy Dresses (Step 4)
 Please Don't Feed the Tiger Lily (Step 4)
 A Fairy Frost (Step 4)

Never Girls
In January 2013, PDW launched Never Girls chapter book series extension of the Disney Fairies franchise under publishing partner Random House's Stepping Stone imprint. The Never Girls chapter series reached the New York Times Best Seller List – Children's Series on the week of August 10. Random House retained publication of this line despite the move of the franchise's general move to Little, Brown in February 2014.

Other books
 In the Realm of the Never Fairies: The Secret World of Pixie Hollow ~ by Monique Peterson (contains information about Pixie Hollow)
 Mysterious Messages ~ by Tennant Redbank
 Prilla's Prize ~ by Lisa Papademetriou
 Secret Fairy Homes
 A Poem for Tink ~ Terence writes a secret poem about Tinker Bell, and in the end, she receives it.
 The Disappearing Sun
 The Shell Gift
 Fairies in Flight ~ by Posner
 Welcome to Pixie Hollow
 Wake UP, Croc! (Little, Brown) Pirate Fairy board book
 Pixy Hollow Reading Adventures (Little, Brown) Passport to Reading, Level 1
 Pirate Fairy Reusable Sticker Book (Little, Brown)

Leveled readers
Disney Fairies: Meet Tinker Bell
Disney Fairies: Meet Zarina the Pirate Fairy
Disney Fairies: Meet Vidia
Disney Fairies: Meet Periwinkle
Disney Fairies: Meet Fawn the Animal-Talent Fairy
Disney Fairies: Meet Nyx the Scout Fairy
Disney Fairies: Meet Rosetta
Disney Fairies: Meet Silvermist
Disney Fairies: Meet Iridessa

Disney Fairies magazine
In June 2006, Egmont Magazines launched a new monthly magazine for girls 5–9 years old, produced by The Walt Disney Company Italia, S.p.A. and published in Italy a couple of months before the Egmont translations. 

The magazine, entitled Fairies, began with an initial print of 110,000 copies and a cover price of £1.99. The magazine's content is centered on Tinker Bell, and her fairy friends from the Pixie Hollow. Each issue features: a collectable pull-out story, games, puzzles, posters and coloring pages. Fairies Magazine has been launched in: Italy, Malaysia, Singapore, Poland, Russia, Spain, the Nordic countries, Portugal, Germany and Benelux.

Graphic novels
In May 2009, Papercutz publishing pickup a license to produce original graphic novels to hit the stands in April 2010 at the rate of four per year.

The 2007 manga and 2008 graphic novel "Disney Fairies: Petite's Little Diary", published by Kodansha and distributed by Tokyopop, follows the misadventures of Tinker Bell and her friends.

Merchandising
In addition to the published work, The Walt Disney Company provides support for Disney Fairies across all business units. The campaign includes the Disney Fairies Website, where visitors can explore and discover information about Disney Fairies. The website allows users to: learn about the fairies, create a fairy, visit Pixie Hollow and explore related merchandise.

Disney Consumer Products have also produced a line of dolls and role-play assortments. The first Disney Fairies products were a series of 10-inch dolls, which were a Disney Store exclusive in January 2006.  Since then, Playmates Toys teamed up with Disney in October 2005 to design and produce a line of toys for the Disney Fairies, which will include: 3.5" small dolls, 8" fashion dolls, playsets and activity sets with DVDs and collectible story cards. Fairy Dust and the Quest for the Egg was the inspiration for the line of toys. Disney Consumer Products launched a wide variety of Disney Fairies branded items, consisting of everything from apparel to stationery.

A series of ten postage stamps were issued by Japan Post in 2006. Each stamp has a face value of 80 JPY and they were distributed in a hardcover case including some information about the Fairies. The stamps could be ordered at some post offices in Japan and were for domestic addresses.

Films

A long-running series of 3D computer-animated films featuring Tinker Bell had been released from 2008 until 2014. Produced by Disneytoon Studios and distributed by Walt Disney Studios Home Entertainment, the series consists of six direct-to-video films and two TV specials.
 Tinker Bell (October 28, 2008)
 Tinker Bell and the Lost Treasure (October 27, 2009)
 Tinker Bell and the Great Fairy Rescue (September 21, 2010)
 Pixie Hollow Games (November 19, 2011; TV special)
 Secret of the Wings (October 23, 2012)
 Pixie Hollow Bake Off (October 20, 2013; TV special)
 The Pirate Fairy (April 1, 2014)
 Tinker Bell and the Legend of the NeverBeast (December 12, 2014)

Theme park attractions

In October 2008, two Pixie Hollow locations opened at Disney Parks. One opened at Disneyland near the Matterhorn Bobsleds in the area where Ariel's Grotto was formerly located and the other at Walt Disney World's Magic Kingdom in Mickey's Toontown. Another version opened at Hong Kong Disneyland on January 21, 2011, as one of the festivities to celebrate the park's 5th anniversary. At these Pixie Hollow locations, guests have the opportunity to meet and greet Tinker Bell and her fairy friends Silvermist, Rosetta, Iridessa, Fawn, Terence and Vidia and her twin sister Periwinkle, from the franchise, as well as dine with them.

The Magic Kingdom location closed in February 2011 as part of the ongoing Fantasyland expansion. A larger Pixie Hollow area was included in the original plans for the expansion, but they have since been abandoned. On July 28, 2011, Tinker Bell and friends returned to the Magic Kingdom in "Tinker Bell's Magical Nook," located at the Adventureland Veranda. However, in 2014, it was closed and Tinker Bell moved to Town Square Theater where she can greet guests alone.

Video game

Pixie Hollow was an MMOG created by The Walt Disney Company and released September 8, 2008. The game was free to play online, however a subscription was needed to have access to things for members only. The website was based partly on the Disney fairy books written by Gail Carson Levine. Free members could create a female Fairy or male Sparrow Man avatar who each came with a small selection of furnishings to decorate a virtual room. Players were able to interact with others and have access to both 'speed' chat with pre-selected phrases and full chat where they can type their messages. They could also play various "Talent Games" or fairy-themed mini-games, found in the various meadows and forests of Pixie Hollow. The game used organic materials as a virtual currency for players to shop. Players could also play games and visit places to earn badges that they could see in their "leaf journal," which also served as a handbook and inventory. Players could purchase a monthly, semi-annual or annual membership. The membership included: Clothing, furniture, access to the ballroom and a hair salon with a spa.

You could also purchase Pixie Diamonds. Members were granted an allowance of Pixie Diamonds (once a month). People who were not members were able to buy clothing, but they had to use Pixie Diamonds.  In January 2012, "Pixie Diamonds" were introduced, an in-game currency that could be purchased with real-world money and used to buy or upgrade items without an active membership. Though the website was geared towards young girls, on April 22, 2010, the game introduced a male character named Slate; he was referred to as a "sparrow man" rather than a male fairy.

On August 20, 2013, it was announced that Pixie Hollow would be closing on September 19, 2013. All the fairies were given unlimited access to the world until the closing date.

Television appearances
To date, two of the characters from the Disney Fairies franchise have appeared in ABC's fantasy drama series Once Upon a Time. Tinker Bell appears as a recurring character played by Rose McIver and debuts in the third episode of season 3. Silvermist appeared in the spin-off Once Upon a Time in Wonderland in the second episode of season 1, where she is played by Jordana Largy.

References

Sources 
 Bradley, L. (2002). Fairy Diaries: Rebecca's Quest. Penguin Young Reader Group.
 "Brittany Murphy Gives Tinker Bell Her Voice" Consumer Products: 2006 Press Releases, June 20, 2006. Retrieved November 10, 2006.
 Coleman, S.M.(1939). The Myth of the Fairy Birth. Psychoanalytic Review 26. pp. 301–314.
 "Disney Fairies franchise gets ready to take flight" Jim Hill. Retrieved November 10, 2006.
 "Disney hopes fairies will fly into girls' hearts" USA Today.com, August 25, 2005. Retrieved November 10, 2006.
 "Disney Publishing Sprinkles Fairy Dust on New Children's Book" LPWire, April 14, 2005. Retrieved November 10, 2006.
 "Disney Publishing Worldwide Announces Unprecedented Global Initiative: Fairy Dust and the Quest for the Egg" Disney Consumer Products: 2005 Press Releases, August 26, 2006. Retrieved November 10, 2006.
 Egmont unveils Disney Fairies magazine in the UK Media Bulletin, May 31, 2006. Retrieved November 10, 2006.
 Factsheet Disney Consumer Products. Retrieved November 10, 2006.
 "Fairies from Neverland Arrive at Disneyland" Disney Consumer Products: 2005 Press Releases, August 28, 2005. Retrieved November 10, 2006.
 Fairy Dust and the Quest for the Egg Amazon.com. Retrieved November 10, 2006.
 Fairy Dust and the Quest for the Egg Disney Consumer Products. Retrieved November 10, 2006.
 Franchise Overview Disney Consumer Products. Retrieved November 11, 2006.
 Franklin, A (2005). The Illustrated Encyclopedia of Fairies. New York: Sterling Publishing Company, Inc.
 Leland, C. G. (2004). Aradia or the Gospel of the Witches. Kessinger Publishing
 Levine, G.C. (2005). Fairy Dust and the Quest for the Egg. New York: Disney Press
 Peterson, M. (2006). In the Realm of the Never Fairies: The Secret World of Pixie Hollow. New York: Disney Press
 "Playmates Toys Enters the Fairy World of Disney's Newest Franchise - Disney Fairies" Consumer Products: 2005 Press Releases, October 27, 2005. Retrieved November 10, 2006.
 Publishing Disney Consumer Products, April 2006. November 11, 2006.
 Disney Fairies: Books Random House: Disney Fairies. Retrieved November 10, 2006.

External links

 
 Disney Fairies Official website in the UK
 Official Disney Fairies Book Web Site
 Pixie Hollow

Disney Fairies
Disney Consumer Products franchises
Fairies and sprites in popular culture
Toy brands
Peter Pan (franchise)
Disney Consumer Products and Interactive Media
Mass media franchises introduced in 2005
Disney franchises
Disneyland